Jo Tudor (born 17 December 1959) is a Canadian equestrian. She competed in the individual eventing at the 1988 Summer Olympics.

References

External links
 

1959 births
Living people
Canadian female equestrians
Olympic equestrians of Canada
Equestrians at the 1988 Summer Olympics
Sportspeople from Winnipeg